DCAF - ; Geneva Centre for Security Sector Governance (French: Centre pour la gouvernance du secteur de la sécurité, Genève, German: Das Genfer Zentrum für die Gouvernanz des Sicherheitssektors) is an intergovernmental foundation-based think tank that provides research and project support to states and international actors in improving security sector governance and reform (SSG and SSR).

DCAF was established in 2000 as the 'Geneva Centre for the Democratic Control of Armed Forces' in the Canton of Geneva by the Swiss government and as of 2018 employs around 170 staff, has seven permanent offices and 63 member states.

The Centre's founding mandate was to assist security institutions to reform themselves in ways that would help stabilize the fragile peace following the 1990s Balkans conflicts and during the democratic transitions of Central and Eastern Europe. At the time, ‘democratic control of armed and security forces' was considered a keystone of lasting peace and stability, under the OSCE's 1994 Code of Conduct on politico-military aspects of security.

The Centre was renamed 'DCAF – Geneva Centre for Security Sector Governance' on 2 May 2019, and took on new branding.

Mandate 
DCAF was established in October 2000 under Swiss law as a foundation and on the initiative of the Swiss government. The organization states that it is a good governance-promoting foundation focusing on a specific public sector area—the security sector. DCAF is mandated by its intergovernmental Foundation Council to assist partner states and international actors in improving the governance of the security sector through reform based on international norms and good practices.

Activities 
DCAF states that it provides in‐country advisory support and practical assistance programmes, identifies recommendations and good practices, develops and promotes norms and standards, and conducts tailored policy research. In 2017, DCAF supported national and international partners in more than 70 countries. The think tank reports that it collaborates with international organizations, such as the United Nations, NATO, the African Union, the Organization for Security and Co-operation in Europe (OSCE) and the European Union (EU).

DCAF was ranked the 33rd (out of 65) in the Top Transparency and Good Governance Think Tanks and the 35th (out of 104) in the Top Defense and National Security Think Tanks on the 2017 Global Go To Think Tank Index The foundation is one of only seven institutions worldwide represented in both categories. Likewise, an external evaluation published in 2014 assessed that DCAF "has an excellent reputation as an organization with solid expertise".

Infrastructure, staff and budget 
DCAF is headquartered at the Maison de la Paix complex in Geneva together with its "sister centres", the Geneva International Centre for Humanitarian Demining (GICHD) and the Geneva Centre for Security Policy (GCSP), as well as the Graduate Institute of International and Development Studies (IHEID) and other peacebuilding-related institutions. In January 2018, DCAF became a member of the Geneva Peacebuilding Platform (GPP), a "a knowledge hub that connects the critical mass of peacebuilding actors, resources, and expertise in Geneva and worldwide". DCAF also maintains permanent offices in Beirut, Brussels, Ljubljana, Ramallah, Tripoli, and Tunis.

In 2020, DCAF employed 210 staff, of whom 60% were women, from 40 different nationalities. Its budget was 29 million Swiss francs. Switzerland provided approximately 66% of the budget and DCAF's top donors in descending order are currently: Switzerland, Germany, Netherlands, United Kingdom, Sweden, Denmark, Norway, European Union, Luxembourg, Ireland. All funding to DCAF qualifies as official development assistance.

Organization 
The Foundation Council is DCAF's supreme decision-making body. As of 2016 it comprises 54 states and the Canton of Geneva as well as four governments and two international organizations that hold observer status. DCAF is organized as a think-and-do tank and at the headquarters its work is carried out according to four pillars:

 
 Policy & Research Division
 Gender & Security Division
 Business & Security Division
 
 Europe & Central Asia Division
 Middle East & North Africa Division
 Sub-Saharan Africa Division
 Asia-Pacific Unit
 Latin America & Caribbean Unit

 
 Financial Resources
 Human Resources
 Administration & Support Services

See also 

 Advocacy
 Gender and security sector reform
 Foreign relations of Switzerland
 International development
 List of think tanks
 Peace and conflict studies

References 

Research institutes in Switzerland
Research institutes of international relations
Maison de la Paix
Military education and training
National security institutions
Peace organisations based in Switzerland
Public policy schools
Security organizations
Security sector governance and reform
Foundations based in Switzerland
International organisations based in Switzerland
Organisations based in Geneva
Think tanks established in 2000
2000 establishments in Switzerland
Foreign policy and strategy think tanks in Europe